The 1991–92 Stanford Cardinal men's basketball team represented Stanford University as a member of the Pacific-10 Conference during the 1991–92 NCAA Division I men's basketball season. Led by head coach Mike Montgomery, the Cardinal played their home games at Maples Pavilion.

Roster

Schedule and results

|-
!colspan=9 style=| Regular season

|-
!colspan=9 style=| NCAA Tournament

Rankings

NBA draft

References

Stanford Cardinal
Stanford Cardinal men's basketball seasons
Stanford Cardinal men's basketball
Stanford Cardinal men's basketball
Stanford